The Konongo are a Bantu ethno-linguistic group based in the Mpanda District of Katavi Region in western Tanzania. In 1987 the Konongo population was estimated to number 51,000 .

Ethnic groups in Tanzania
Indigenous peoples of East Africa